Södra Skogsägarna, trading as Södra, is a forestry cooperative based in Växjö, Sweden. More than 52,000 forest owners in southern Sweden are members of the economic association that is Södra. They own just over half of all privately owned forest in the area, as well as a group of companies that are successful in both Swedish and international markets. This gives them a market for their raw materials from the forest and at the same time provides the foundation for profitable forestry.

3,150 people work for the group, in areas that range from forestry management and environmental conservation to accounting, sales and product development. The group's three business areas produce sawn and planed timber goods, paper pulp and biofuel. In recent years Södra has also become such a large producer of electricity that the group now produces more electricity than it uses.

References

Cooperatives in Sweden
Companies based in Kronoberg County
Pulp and paper companies of Sweden